The AMA National Speedway Championship is an annual speedway championship to decide the American Motorcyclist Association (AMA) national speedway champion. This event is separate from the (SRA) United States National Championships.

Roll of honour

Medals classification
(Since 1968)

References

Speedway in the United States
National speedway championships